St. Lucie Nuclear Power Plant is a twin nuclear power station located on Hutchinson Island, near Port St. Lucie in St. Lucie County, Florida.  Both units are Combustion Engineering pressurized water reactors. Florida Power & Light commissioned the station in 1976 and continues to operate the station. 
Minor shares of Unit 2 are owned by the Florida Municipal Power Agency (8.81%) and the Orlando Utilities Commission (6.08%).

The plant contains two nuclear reactors in separate containment buildings.  However, the plant does not have the classic hyperboloid cooling towers found at many inland reactor sites; instead, it uses nearby ocean water for coolant of the secondary system.

In 2003 the Nuclear Regulatory Commission (NRC) extended the operating licenses of the St. Lucie units by twenty years, to March 1, 2036 for Unit 1 and April 6, 2043 for Unit 2.

Extended Power Uprate
In 2012, Extended Power Uprate modifications were completed, increasing the electric output from approximately 853 MW to 1,002 MW. The project involved  replacing pipes, valves, pumps, heat exchangers, electrical transformers, and generators, some of which were original components of the plant.

Electricity Production

Surrounding population

The 2010 U.S. population within  of Saint Lucie was 206,596, an increase of 49.7 percent in a decade, according to an analysis of U.S. Census data for msnbc.com. The 2010 U.S. population within  was 1,271,947, an increase of 37.0 percent since 2000. Cities within 50 miles include Port St. Lucie (7.8 miles to city center), Ft. Pierce (8 miles to city center), Stuart and West Palm Beach (42 miles to city center).

Seismic risk
The Nuclear Regulatory Commission's estimate of the risk each year of an earthquake intense enough to cause core damage to the reactor at Saint Lucie was 1 in 21,739, according to an NRC study published in August 2010.

Hurricane risk
In 2016 St. Lucie Power Plant shut down because of Hurricane Matthew.
In 2017 the plant did not shut down due to Hurricane Irma.

See also

List of power stations in Florida,.

References

External links
FPL's About St. Lucie

Nuclear power plants in Florida
Buildings and structures in St. Lucie County, Florida
NextEra Energy
Nuclear power stations using pressurized water reactors
Port St. Lucie, Florida
Port St. Lucie metropolitan area
Energy infrastructure completed in 1976
Energy infrastructure completed in 1983
1976 establishments in Florida